Frederick "Fred" Cresser (born March, 1872, date of death unknown) was an American rower who competed in the 1904 Summer Olympics. He was born in the German Empire. In 1904, he was part of the American boat, which won the gold medal in the eights.

References

External links
 
 
 

1872 births
Year of death missing
Rowers at the 1904 Summer Olympics
Olympic gold medalists for the United States in rowing
American male rowers
Medalists at the 1904 Summer Olympics